Zir Taq Doab (also Romanized as Zīr Ţāq Doāb; also known as Zīr Ţāq) is a village in Doab Rural District, in the Central District of Selseleh County, Lorestan Province, Iran. At the 2006 census, its population was 88, in 16 families.

References 

Towns and villages in Selseleh County